Ahmad Afandi Abdulaev (born 15 September 1959, Upper Inkho, Gumbetovsky district) —  is a Russian Mufti. He serves as Chairman of the Spiritual Administration of Muslims of Dagestan, Sheikh of Naqshbandi and Shazali Tariqas, one of the spiritual leaders of Dagestani Muslims.

Early life 
Ahmad Haji Afandi Abdulaev was born on September 15, 1959 in the Dagestan Autonomous Soviet Socialist Republic, in the village of Inkho, Gumbetovsky District. From his earliest years, Ahmad Haji studied Arabic and Islam. His family practiced devotion to faith, even during Soviet times, when believers were persecuted. His relatives took care of their faith and raised their children according to Islamic precepts. Ahmad Haji is the grandson of the famous Sufi sheikh of Naqshbandi and Shazali Tariqas Abdulhamid-Afandi.

Career 
In 1991, Ahmad-Haji became the Imam of a mosque in Kizilyurt district. In 1992 he began teaching at the Islamic Institute in Kizilyurt, where he served as Rector. In 1998, at the Council of the Alims of Dagestan, Abdulaev was unanimously elected as Mufti and Chairman of the Spiritual Administration of Dagestani Muslims.

In 2010, he received the Spiritual Mentor ijazah from Said Afandi al-Chirkawi, but he did not take up instructing Murids. After Said Afandi's death, his successor Abduljalil-Afandi made an order (amr) to Ahmad Abdulaev to instruct the Murids.

In 2013, the Mufti received the honorary status of Guardian of the Holy Relics of the Prophet Muhammad, and also the relics themselves, including the hair of Muhammad.

Awards 
 Order of Merit "For services to the Republic of Dagestan"(2009)
 Anniversary Medal "50th Anniversary of ROSSNAA" (Russian Society of Solidarity and Cooperation of the Peoples of Asia and Africa) (2011)
 Gold Star of the People's Hero of Dagestan  (2015)
 Commemorative Medal in honor of opening of the Moscow Cathedral Mosque complex (2015)
 Medal of Honor of Dagestan Republic "For the love of his native land" (2016)
 Golden "Order of the Peacemaker" (2018) 
 Memorable badge of RosAviation "95 years of Civil Aviation of Russia" (2018) 
 Anniversary Commemorative Medal "90th Anniversary of Civil Aviation of the Republic of Dagestan" (2018)
 Memorable badge of the Russian Parliament "25 years of The Federation Council" (2019) 
 Order of Friendship (2019)
 Order of Merit for the Ummah, I degree  (2019)
 Order of Glory and Honor  (2019)
 Medal "For Valiant Labor" - for services to the Republic of Dagestan  (2021) 
 Medal "For loyalty to the Fatherland"  (2021)

Bibliography
In 2015, his book The Virtues of the Righteous was published in Arabic, its translations in Avar, Russian, Tajik, Kazakh, Kyrgyz and Uzbek languages were published subsequently. By the end of 2015, total circulation exceeded 200,000 copies. Based on the book a series of video lessons, as well as audio book followed its release.

References

External links 
 The Virtues of the Righteous (in Arabic)

1959 births
21st-century Muslim scholars of Islam
Russian imams
Russian Sufis
Russian Sufi religious leaders
Avar people
20th-century Islamic religious leaders
Naqshbandi order
Soviet Sufis
Sunni Sufis
Living people
Russian people of Dagestani descent